The Greece women's national water polo team represents Greece in international women's water polo competitions. Since the mid-1990s, Greece have emerged as one of the leading powers in the world, becoming World Champions after their gold medal win at the 2011 World Championship. They have also won the silver medal at the 2004 Summer Olympics, the gold medal at the 2005 World League, 3 silver medals at the 2010, 2012 and 2018 European Championships and the gold medal at the 2018 Europa Cup.

Honours

Gold medals
 World Championship: 2011
 World League: 2005
 Europa Cup: 2018

Silver medals
 Olympic Games: 2004
 European Championship: 2010, 2012, 2018, 2022

Bronze medals
 World League: 2007, 2010, 2012
 Mediterranean Games: 2018

Results

Olympic Games

World Championship

FINA World Cup

FINA World League

European Championships

LEN Europa Cup

Mediterranean Games

Note

a.  The women had to wait for Olympic recognition by the IOC, and played their own "Olympic Tournament" with twelve competing teams, from 29 May to 7 June 1996 in Emmen, Netherlands.

Team

Current squad
Roster for the 2020 Women's Water Polo Olympic Qualification Tournament.

Head coach: Theodoros Lorantos

Past squads

 2004 Olympic Games –  Silver Medal
 Georgia Ellinaki, Dimitra Asilian, Antiopi Melidoni, Angeliki Karapataki, Kyriaki Liosi, Stavroula Kozompoli, Aikaterini Oikonomopoulou, Antigoni Roumpesi, Evangelia Moraitidou, Eftychia Karagianni, Georgia Lara, Antonia Moraiti, Anthoula Mylonaki. Head Coach: Kyriakos Iosifidis

 2005 FINA World League –  Gold Medal
 Georgia Ellinaki, Vasileia Mavrelou, Kelina Kantzou, Sofia Iosifidou, Kyriaki Liosi, Stavroula Kozompoli, Aikaterini Oikonomopoulou, Antigoni Roumpesi, Evangelia Moraitidou, Eftychia Karagianni, Alexandra Asimaki, Georgia Lara, Maria Tsouri. Head Coach: Kyriakos Iosifidis

 2010 European Championship –  Silver Medal
Maria Tsouri, Christina Tsoukala, Antiopi Melidoni, Ilektra Psouni, Kyriaki Liosi, Alkisti Avramidou, Alexandra Asimaki, Antigoni Roumpesi, Angeliki Gerolymou, Triantafyllia Manolioudaki, Stavroula Antonakou, Georgia Lara, Eleni Kouvdou. Head Coach: Giorgos Morfesis

 2011 World Championship –  Gold Medal
 Eleni Kouvdou, Christina Tsoukala, Antiopi Melidoni, Ilektra Psouni, Kyriaki Liosi, Alkisti Avramidou, Alexandra Asimaki, Antigoni Roumpesi, Angeliki Gerolymou, Triantafyllia Manolioudaki, Stavroula Antonakou, Georgia Lara, Eleni Goula. Head Coach: Giorgos Morfesis

 2012 European Championship –  Silver Medal
 Eleni Kouvdou, Christina Tsoukala, Antiopi Melidoni, Ilektra Psouni, Kyriaki Liosi, Alkisti Avramidou, Alexandra Asimaki, Antigoni Roumpesi, Angeliki Gerolymou, Triantafyllia Manolioudaki, Stavroula Antonakou, Georgia Lara, Chrysi Diamantopoulou. Head Coach: Giorgos Morfesis

 2018 Europa Cup –  Gold Medal
 Eleni Kouvdou, Christina Tsoukala, Vasiliki Diamantopoulou, Nikoleta Eleftheriadou, Margarita Plevritou, Alkisti Avramidou, Alexandra Asimaki, Ioanna Chydirioti, Maria Patra, Anastasia Kalargirou, Eleftheria Plevritou, Eleni Xenaki, Chrysi Diamantopoulou. Head Coach: Giorgos Morfesis

 2018 European Championship –  Silver Medal
Chrysi Diamantopoulou, Christina Tsoukala, Vasiliki Diamantopoulou, Nikoleta Eleftheriadou, Margarita Plevritou, Alkisti Avramidou, Alexandra Asimaki, Ioanna Chydirioti, Maria Patra, Elisavet Protopapas, Eleftheria Plevritou, Eleni Xenaki, Ioanna Stamatopoulou. Head Coach: Giorgos Morfesis

Under-20 team
Greece lastly competed at the 2021 FINA Junior Water Polo World Championships where they won the silver medal.

See also
 Greece women's Olympic water polo team records and statistics
 Greece men's national water polo team
 List of world champions in women's water polo

References

FINA

External links
Official website

Women's national water polo teams